The Saunders County Courthouse is a historic building in Wahoo, Nebraska, and the courthouse of Saunders County, Nebraska. It was built in 1904, and it was designed in the Renaissance Revival style by Fisher & Lawrie, an architectural firm based in Omaha. Architectural finishes include "Ornate, rich, dark woodwork (pediments with dentils, fluted Corinthian pilasters, paneling), stained glass (stylized organic patterns and geometric shapes), plasterwork (swags and wreaths, beams, dentils, acanthus consoles, moulding, Ionic capitals), marble in two colors (wainscoting, mopboard, stair treads), floor tile (in halls, of an elaborate pattern in six colors), brass newels (with urns and Ionic capitals)." It has been listed on the National Register of Historic Places since January 10, 1990.

References

County courthouses in Nebraska
National Register of Historic Places in Saunders County, Nebraska
Renaissance Revival architecture in Nebraska
Government buildings completed in 1904
1904 establishments in Nebraska